Jeffrey Manday (born March 29, 1995) is a Filipino professional basketball player for the Meralco Bolts 3x3 of the Philippine Basketball Association PBA 3x3.

Professional career

San Miguel Beermen 3x3 (2021–present)
Manday was selected in the sixth round of the 2020 PBA draft with the 58th overall pick by the San Miguel Beermen but was not signed. In July 2021, he signed with the Beermen's 3x3 team.

References

External links
PBA 3x3 profile

1995 births
Living people
San Miguel Beermen draft picks
Filipino men's basketball players
Sportspeople from Bacolod
Point guards
Tagalog people
Filipino men's 3x3 basketball players
PBA 3x3 players
Basketball players from Negros Occidental